Storthoptera is a monotypic moth genus of the family Noctuidae. Its only species, Storthoptera tripuncta, is found in Africa. Both the genus and the species were first described by Gottlieb August Wilhelm Herrich-Schäffer, the genus in 1856 and the species one year earlier.

References

Catocalinae
Monotypic moth genera